Geothermal power accounts for about 1.6-1.8% of the total electric energy production in Italy and is about 7% of the total renewable energy produced in 2010.
The total energy from Geothermal was 5,660 GWh in 2015. Italy is the seventh country by geothermal installed capacity.

Italy was the first country in the world to exploit geothermal energy to produce electricity. The high geothermal gradient that forms part of the peninsula makes potentially exploitable also other provinces: research carried out in the 1960s and 1970s identifies potential geothermal fields in Lazio and Tuscany, as well as in most volcanic islands.

There are 33 active geothermal plants with a total capacity of 772 MW. All the plants are in Tuscany in the provinces of Grosseto, Pisa and Siena. The province of Pisa alone contributes for more than half of the national production.

History
In the 20th century, demand for electricity led to the consideration of geothermal power as a generating source. Prince Piero Ginori Conti tested the first geothermal power generator on 4 July 1904 in Larderello, in the province of Pisa. It successfully lit four light bulbs. Later, in 1911, the world's first commercial geothermal power plant was built there. Experimental generators were built in other countries in the 1920s, but Italy was the world's only industrial producer of geothermal electricity until 1958.

Current development
On 30 May 2012, Enel Green Power announced the entry into service of the completely new geothermal power station Rancia 2 in the town of Radicondoli, in the province of Siena. The plant, which has a net installed capacity of 17 MW, will be able to generate about 150 GWh per year. The remaking of the central Rancia 2 falls within the group business plan 2012-2016, which envisages an investment package of around 500 million euros for development of geothermal plants in Tuscany.

While the update of Rancia 1 and Le Prata (in the towns of Radicondoli (SI) and Castelnuovo di Val di Cecina (PI) respectively) are in progress, the total renovation will also start soon for the three geothermal plants located in the town of Piancastagnaio (SI).

In 2013, Enel Green Power installed Gruppo Binario Bagnore3–1 MW. It was the first binary cycle power plant in Italy.

See also

Biofuel in Italy
Electricity sector in Italy
Geothermal energy in Italy
Hydroelectricity in Italy
List of renewable energy topics by country
Renewable energy in Italy
Solar power in Italy
Wind power in Italy

References

Further reading

Geothermal energy in Italy